"Lay with You" is the second single by American R&B singer El DeBarge, featuring R&B singer Faith Evans, from the fifth studio album, Second Chance (2010). The song was released on October 25, 2010 through Geffen Records. It was written by E.J. Coulter and Michael Flowers and produced by Michael "Mike City" Flowers. The music video was released on November 8, 2010 on El DeBarge's VEVO account.

Chart performance
On March 12, 2011, the song reached its peak at number two on the Adult R&B Songs chart in its seventeenth week, and number 80 on the Radio Songs chart. On February 19, the song reached its peak at number nineteen on the R&B/Hip-Hop Airplay chart in its fourteenth week and number twenty on the Hot R&B/Hip-Hop Songs chart in its fifteenth week.

Charts

Weekly charts

Year-end charts

References

Faith Evans songs
Geffen Records singles
2010 singles
2010 songs
Songs written by Mike City